Yellow Tape is the debut studio album by American rapper Key Glock from Memphis, Tennessee. It was released on January 31, 2020, through Paper Route Empire. Production was handled by Bandplay, LDG Beats and Sledgren among others. The album peaked at number 14 on the Billboard 200 in the United States.  

A music video for "Look At They Face" was directed by Jordan Spencer and released on January 13, 2020. Videos for "Mr. Glock" and "I'm Just Sayin" were released on January 18, 2020, and January 29, 2020, respectively, also directed by Jordan Spencer.

Track listing

Charts

References

2020 mixtape albums
Empire Distribution albums
Key Glock albums